Terence Steward (born April 10, 1965) is a former American football wide receiver in the National Football League for the Dallas Cowboys. He played college football at Lenoir–Rhyne University.

Early years
Steward accepted a football scholarship from Lenoir-Rhyne College. As a freshman, he was named a starter at wide receiver, collecting 29 receptions for 434 yards. 

As a sophomore in 1984, he led the NAIA with 1,040 receiving yards, while also making 65 catches. He had 8 receptions for 179 yards against Guilford College. As a junior in 1985, he posted 75 receptions for 1,052 yards.

As a senior, he broke his own school single-season record, registering 78 receptions for 1,105 receiving yards. He set school single-game records with 18 receptions for 266 yards against Mars Hill College.  He also made 9 receptions for 180 yards against Davidson College.

At the time, he finished his college career with 247 receptions (school record and 3rd in NAIA history), 3,631 receiving yards (school record and 1st in NAIA history) and 18 receiving touchdowns (second in school history).

In 1998, he was inducted into the Lenoir-Rhyne Sports Hall of Fame. In 2001, he was inducted into the South Atlantic Conference Hall of Fame.

Professional career
Steward was signed as an undrafted free agent by the Dallas Cowboys after the 1987 NFL Draft. He was waived on August 31.

After the NFLPA strike was declared on the third week of the 1987 season, Steward was re-signed to be a part of the Dallas Cowboys replacement team. He was a third-string wide receiver in the first 2 replacement games. He suffered a knee injury while practicing for the third game and chose to rehabilitate instead of surgery. He was placed on the injured reserve list and was not re-signed at the end of the season.

References

1965 births
Living people
American football wide receivers
Lenoir–Rhyne Bears football players
Dallas Cowboys players
National Football League replacement players
Lenoir–Rhyne University alumni